Omorgus trilobus is a species of hide beetle in the subfamily Omorginae.

References

trilobus
Beetles described in 1954